The 2012 UNAF U-17 Tournament (Morocco) is the tenth edition of the UNAF U-17 Tournament and the second one this year after the Tunisian edition. The tournament took place in Rabat from 24 to 27 December 2012.

Participants

 (invited)

Tournament

Champions

Scorers
2 goals

 Ayoub Driss
 Nidal Ben Salem
 Hazem Haj Hassan
 Chams Samti

1 goal

 Mouadh Ellafi
 Mohamed Taktak
 Mohamed Kory
 El Hassan Moctar Sidi
 Gueye Youssef
 Ali Hadji
 Moez Aboud
 Ameur Omrani

References

2012 in African football
2012
2012
2012–13 in Moroccan football
2012–13 in Tunisian football
2012–13 in Libyan football